Charles Pelton Hutchins (September 10, 1872 – December 28, 1938) was an American football and baseball coach and college athletics administrator. He served as the head football coach at Dickinson College (1902–1903), Syracuse University (1904–1905), and University of Wisconsin–Madison (1906–1907), compiling a career college football coaching record of 33–17–1. From 1904 to 1905, he coached at Syracuse, tallying a 14–6 record. From 1906 to 1907, he coached at Wisconsin, where he compiled an 8–1–1 record. Hutchins was also the athletic director at Indiana University Bloomington from 1911 to 1913.

Head coaching record

Football

References

1872 births
1938 deaths
Dickinson Red Devils football coaches
Indiana Hoosiers athletic directors
Kansas Jayhawks football coaches
Syracuse Orange football coaches
Wisconsin Badgers baseball coaches
Wisconsin Badgers football coaches
Columbia University Vagelos College of Physicians and Surgeons alumni
Williams College alumni
Sportspeople from Brooklyn